Shane Casey may refer to:

Shane Casey (actor), Irish actor
Shane Casey (hurler), Waterford hurling player
Shane Casey, a CSI:NY character